The 2019 NCAA Men's Gymnastics Championships were held from April 19–20, 2019 at the State Farm Center in Champaign, Illinois.

National qualifier sessions

Session 1
The first national qualifier session of the 2021 NCAA Men's Gymnastics Championships took place on April 19, 2019. The following teams competed in Session 1.
 Michigan
 Stanford
 Nebraska
 Minnesota
 Navy
 California

Session 2
The second national qualifier session of the 2019 NCAA Men's Gymnastics Championships took place on April 19, 2019. The following teams competed in Session 2.
 Oklahoma
 Ohio State
 Illinois
 Army
 Penn State
 Iowa

NCAA Championship
The top three teams from each session advanced to the National Championship.

Standings
National Champion: Stanford – 415.222
2nd Place: Oklahoma – 414.556
3rd Place: Nebraska – 407.489

Individual event finals
The top-three all-around competitors and top-three individuals on each event who are not members of one of the qualifying teams advanced from each pre-qualifying session to the finals session to compete for individual titles. Finals competition took place on April 20.

Medalists

References

NCAA Men's Gymnastics championship
2019 in American sports
NCAA Men's Gymnastics Championship
Sports competitions in Illinois